Patrik Järbyn (born 16 April 1969 in Målsryd, Sweden) is a Swedish former World Cup alpine ski racer.

Despite never having won a World Cup race, Järbyn has two individual World Championship medals. At the 1996 World Championships in Sierra Nevada, Spain, he won the silver medal in super-G. In 2007 at Åre, Sweden, he won the bronze medal in the downhill to become the oldest medalist ever at a World Championships.

On 19 December 2008, Järbyn finished third in a super-G at Val Gardena, Italy, and set a new record as the oldest man to score a podium finish in a World Cup alpine race, at the age of 39 years and 9 months. Järbyn broke his own record, set with a third-place finish in the super-G at Lake Louise in November 2006 at the age of 37 years and 8 months.

On 19 February 2010, in the 2010 Winter Olympics in Vancouver, Järbyn suffered a concussion after crashing up in Whistler in the men's super-G and was air-lifted to a hospital by helicopter. On 7 March 2012, Järbyn officially announced his retirement. His last race was in Kvitfjell on 4 March 2012.

References

External links 
  
 
 
 

1969 births
Swedish male alpine skiers
Alpine skiers at the 1994 Winter Olympics
Alpine skiers at the 1998 Winter Olympics
Alpine skiers at the 2002 Winter Olympics
Alpine skiers at the 2006 Winter Olympics
Alpine skiers at the 2010 Winter Olympics
Olympic alpine skiers of Sweden
People from Borås Municipality
Living people
Sportspeople from Västra Götaland County
21st-century Swedish people